The Junior women's race at the 1993 IAAF World Cross Country Championships was held in Amorebieta, Spain, at the Jaureguibarría Course on March 28, 1993.   A report on the event was given in The New York Times and in the Herald.

Complete results, medallists, 
 and the results of British athletes were published.

Race results

Junior women's race (4.45 km)

Individual

Teams

Note: Athletes in parentheses did not score for the team result

Participation
An unofficial count yields the participation of 119 athletes from 32 countries in the Junior women's race.  This is in agreement with the official numbers as published.

 (1)
 (1)
 (5)
 (2)
 (4)
 (6)
 (6)
 (1)
 (5)
 (1)
 (6)
 (5)
 (5)
 (4)
 (6)
 (6)
 (5)
 (3)
 (1)
 (1)
 (1)
 (5)
 (1)
 (5)
 (4)
 (6)
 (6)
 (2)
 (2)
 (6)
 (6)
 (1)

See also
 1993 IAAF World Cross Country Championships – Senior men's race
 1993 IAAF World Cross Country Championships – Junior men's race
 1993 IAAF World Cross Country Championships – Senior women's race

References

Junior women's race at the World Athletics Cross Country Championships
IAAF World Cross Country Championships
1993 in women's athletics
1993 in youth sport